The Louisiana Purchase Exposition, informally known as the St. Louis World's Fair, was an international exposition held in St. Louis, Missouri, United States, from April 30 to December 1, 1904. Local, state, and federal funds totaling $15 million were used to finance the event. More than 60 countries and 43 of the then-45 American states maintained exhibition spaces at the fair, which was attended by nearly 19.7 million people.

Historians generally emphasize the prominence of the themes of race and imperialism, and the fair's long-lasting impact on intellectuals in the fields of history, art history, architecture and anthropology. From the point of view of the memory of the average person who attended the fair, it primarily promoted entertainment, consumer goods and popular culture. The monumental Greco-Roman architecture of this and other fairs of the era did much to influence permanent new buildings and master plans of major cities.

Background 

In 1904, St. Louis hosted a World's Fair to celebrate the centennial of the 1803 Louisiana Purchase. The idea for such a commemorative event seems to have emerged early in 1898, with Kansas City and St. Louis initially presented as potential hosts for a fair based on their central location within the territory encompassed by the 1803 land annexation.

The exhibition was grand in scale and lengthy in preparation, with an initial $5 million committed by the city of St. Louis through the sale of city bonds was authorized by the Missouri state legislature in April 1899. An additional $5 million was generated through private donations by interested citizens and businesses from around Missouri, a fundraising target reached in January 1901. The final installment of $5 million of the exposition's $15 million capitalization came in the form of earmarked funds that were part of a congressional appropriations bill passed at the end of May 1900. The fundraising mission was aided by the active support of President of the United States William McKinley, which was won by organizers in a February 1899 White House visit.

While initially conceived as a centennial celebration to be held in 1903, the actual opening of the St. Louis exposition was delayed until April 30, 1904, to allow for full-scale participation by more states and foreign countries. The exposition operated until December 1, 1904. During the year of the fair, the Louisiana Purchase Exposition supplanted the annual St. Louis Exposition of agricultural, trade, and scientific exhibitions which had been held in the city since the 1880s.

The fair's  (1.9 mi) site, designed by George Kessler, was located at the present-day grounds of Forest Park and on the campus of Washington University, and was the largest fair (in area) to date. It was said to be impossible to give even a hurried glance at everything in less than a week.

Exhibits were staged by approximately 50 foreign nations, the United States government, and 43 of the then-45 U.S. states. These featured industries, cities, private organizations and corporations, theater troupes, and music schools. There were also over 50 concession-type amusements found on "The Pike"; they provided educational and scientific displays, exhibits and imaginary 'travel' to distant lands, history and local boosterism (including Louis Wollbrinck's "Old St. Louis") and pure entertainment.

Over 19 million (19,694,855, to be precise) individuals were in attendance at the fair.

Aspects that attracted visitors included the buildings and architecture, new foods, popular music, and exotic people on display. American culture was showcased at the fair especially regarding innovations in communication, medicine, and transportation.

Architects 

George Kessler, who designed many urban parks in Texas and the Midwest, created the master design for the Fair.

A popular myth says that Frederick Law Olmsted, who had died the year before the Fair, designed the park and fair grounds. There are several reasons for this confusion. First, Kessler in his twenties had worked briefly for Olmsted as a Central Park gardener. Second, Olmsted was involved with Forest Park in Queens, New York. Third, Olmsted had planned the renovations in 1897 to the Missouri Botanical Garden several blocks to the southeast of the park. Finally, Olmsted's sons advised Washington University on integrating the campus with the park across the street.

In 1901 the Louisiana Purchase Exposition Corporation selected prominent St. Louis architect Isaac S. Taylor as the Chairman of the Architectural Commission and Director of Works for the fair, supervising the overall design and construction. Taylor quickly appointed Emmanuel Louis Masqueray to be his Chief of Design. In the position for three years, Masqueray designed the following Fair buildings: Palace of Agriculture, the Cascades and Colonnades, Palace of Forestry, Fish, and Game, Palace of Horticulture and Palace of Transportation, all of which were widely emulated in civic projects across the United States as part of the City Beautiful movement. Masqueray resigned shortly after the Fair opened in 1904, having been invited by Archbishop John Ireland of St. Paul, Minnesota to design a new cathedral for the city.[4]

Board of Commissioners 

Florence Hayward, a successful freelance writer in St. Louis in the 1900s, was determined to play a role in the World's Fair. She negotiated a position on the otherwise all-male Board of Commissioners. Hayward learned that one of the potential contractors for the fair was not reputable and warned the Louisiana Purchase Exposition Company (LPEC). In exchange for this information, she requested an appointment as roving commissioner to Europe.

Former Mayor of St. Louis and Governor of Missouri David R. Francis, LPEC president, made the appointment and allowed Hayward to travel overseas to promote the fair, especially to women. The fair also had a Board of Lady Managers (BLM) who felt they had jurisdiction over women's activities at the fair and objected to Hayward's appointment without their knowledge. Despite this, Hayward set out for England in 1902. Hayward's most notable contribution to the fair was acquiring gifts Queen Victoria received for her Golden Jubilee and other historical items, including manuscripts from the Vatican. These items were all to be shown in exhibits at the fair.

Pleased with her success in Europe, Francis put her in charge of historical exhibits in the anthropology division, which had originally been assigned to Pierre Chouteau III. Despite being the only woman on the Board of Commissioners, creating successful anthropological exhibits, publicizing the fair, and acquiring significant exhibit items, Hayward's role in the fair was not acknowledged. When Francis published a history of the fair in 1913, he did not mention Hayward's contributions and she never forgave the slight.

Scientific contributions 

Many of the inventions displayed were precursors to items which have become an integral part of today's culture. Novel applications of electricity and light waves for communication and medical use were displayed in the Palace of Electricity. According to an article he wrote for Harper's Weekly, W.E. Goldsborough, the Chief of the Department of Electricity for the Fair, wished to educate the public and dispel the misconceptions about electricity which many common people believed. New and updated methods of transportation also showcased at the World's Fair in the Palace of Transportation would come to revolutionize transportation for the modern day.

Communication contributions 
Wireless telephone – The "wireless telephony" unit or "radiophone" installed at the St. Louis World Fair was a thing of wonder to the crowds. Music or spoken messages were transmitted from an apparatus within the Palace of Electricity to a telephone receiver out in the courtyard. The receiver, which was attached to nothing, when placed to the ear allowed a visitor to hear the transmission. This radiophone, invented by Alexander Graham Bell, consisted of a transmitter which transformed sound waves into light waves and a receiver which converted the light waves back into sound waves. This technology has since developed into the radio and telephone.

Early fax machine – The telautograph, the precursor to the modern day fax machine, was invented in 1888 by the American scientist, Elisha Gray who at one point in time contested Alexander Graham Bell's invention of the telephone. The telautograph was a device which could send electrical impulses to the receiving pen of the device, in order to be able to recreate drawings to a piece of paper while a person simultaneously wrote them longhand on the other end of the device. In 1900, Gray's assistant, Foster Ritchie, improved upon the original design, and it was this device that was displayed at the 1904 World's Fair and marketed for the next thirty years.

Medical contributions 
Finsen light – The Finsen light, a phototherapy unit invented by Niels Ryberg Finsen, utilized ultraviolet light to treat a form of lupus caused by the bacteria Mycobacterium tuberculosis. Finsen was awarded the Nobel Prize in Medicine and Physiology in 1903 for his contributions and his invention pioneered the way which led to many other forms of radiation therapy in the treatment of disease.

X-ray machine – The X-ray machine was an invention that had its public debut at the 1904 World's Fair. X-rays were first discovered in November 1895 by a German scientist, Wilhelm Conrad Röntgen, who at the time was studying the phenomena accompanying the passage of an electric current through a gas of extremely low pressure. After Rontgen's discovery, he took an x-ray of his wife's hand, showing the bones and her fingers along with her wedding ring, and sent it to several of his scientist colleagues. One of the scientists that learned of the discovery was Thomas Edison and he soon began to experiment with his own x-ray machine with his assistant Clarence Dally. In 1901, Dally brought a test version of the X-ray machine to the 1901 World's Fair but failed to test the machine when President McKinley was assassinated. For the 1904 World's Fair, the X-ray machine was perfected and successfully shown to the public. X-rays are now commonplace in hospitals and airports.

Infant incubator – Although infant incubators were invented in the year 1888 by Drs. Alan M. Thomas and William Champion, these devices were not immediately widely used. To increase awareness of the benefits these units provided, infant incubators containing premature babies were displayed at the 1897, 1898, 1901, and 1904 World Fairs. This piece of medical equipment helped neonates with compromised immune systems by providing a sanitary environment to reduce the likelihood of acquiring an infection. Each incubator was an air-tight glass box with a metal frame. Hot air was pumped into the container to keep a constant temperature. Newspapers advertised the incubators with "lives are being preserved by this wonderful method." During the World Fair in 1904, E. M. Bayliss brought these devices for exhibition on The Pike where approximately ten nurses cared for twenty-four neo-natal babies while in the infant incubators. The exhibit required an entrance fee of twenty-five cents and visitors could also purchase souvenirs and refreshments from the adjoining shop and café. These proceeds, totaling $181,632, helped to fund Bayliss's project. There were some setbacks with the infant incubator display as the sanitary conditions were not always consistent and some babies died of illness. The incubator area was then modified by installing glass walls to separate the babies from visitors, thus decreasing the exposure of the infants. The science and technology behind the incubators has since been expanded upon. Now known as "isolettes," these units are a vital component to caring for neonates in modern neonatal intensive care units.

Transportation contributions 
Electric streetcar – Although street railways had been in use in North America since the early 19th century, electric street railcars were still relatively novel at the time of the Louisiana Purchase Exposition. Outside of the Palace of Electricity, an exhibit including a working electric street car and 1400 feet of track demonstrated the speed, acceleration, and braking capacities of this new-powered model. Electric railways for inner-city transport are still used in many cities today.

Personal automobile – One of the most popular attractions of the Exposition was contained in the Palace of Transportation: automobiles and motor cars. The automobile display contained 140 models including ones powered by gasoline, steam, and electricity. The private automobile first made its public debut at the Louisiana Purchase Exposition. Four years after the Louisiana Purchase Exposition, the Ford Motor Company began producing the Ford Model T making the personal automobile more affordable. Since that time, the automobile has increased in popularity, advanced in technology, and expanded the mobility of humanity. A prototype car radio was also demonstrated by inventor Lee de Forest.

Airplane – The 1904 World's Fair hosted the first-ever "Airship Contest" since aerial navigation was still in its infancy at this time. The Exposition offered a grand prize of $100,000 to the airship or other flying machine with the best time through a course marked out by stationary air balloons while travelling at least 15 miles per hour. Although none were able to earn the grand prize, the contest did witness the first public dirigible flight in America as well as numerous other flights made by various airships. This was the first major event in a history of aviation in St. Louis leading to the city's nickname, Flight City. The science of aerial navigation continued to develop and has been mastered since the 1904 Exposition. Air travel has become a vital component in today's global society.

Legacy 
Since many people were curious about this up-and-coming city, many reporters and photographers attended the World's Fair to document and understand the city. What they found was nothing like anyone else could have imagined. The streets were buzzing with activity, with many of its citizens constantly on the "go" and the streets "crowded with activity". One observer remarked that, at this time, St. Louis had more energy in its streets than any other northern city did.

Buildings 

With more and more people interested in the city, St. Louis government and architects were primarily concerned with their ports and access to the city. Though transportation by water had always been important to the city (St. Louis had originated as a trading post), it was becoming even more important that the port be open, but efficient for all visitors. It also needed to show off some of the city's flair and excitement, which is why in many photographs one sees photos of St. Louis' skyscrapers in the background. In addition to a functioning port, the Eads Bridge was constructed, which was considered one of St. Louis' "sights".

As with the World's Columbian Exposition in Chicago in 1893, all but one of the Louisiana Purchase Exposition's grand, neo-Classical exhibition palaces were temporary structures, designed to last but a year or two. They were built with a material called "staff," a mixture of plaster of Paris and hemp fibers, on a wood frame. As at the Chicago World's Fair, buildings and statues deteriorated during the months of the Fair and had to be patched.

The Palace of Fine Art, designed by architect Cass Gilbert, featured a grand interior sculpture court based on the Roman Baths of Caracalla. Standing at the top of Art Hill, it now serves as the home of the St. Louis Art Museum.

The Administration Building, designed by Cope & Stewardson, is now Brookings Hall, the defining landmark on the campus of Washington University. A similar building was erected at Northwest Missouri State University founded in 1905 in Maryville, Missouri. The grounds' layout was also recreated in Maryville and now is designated as the official Missouri State Arboretum.

Some mansions from the Exposition's era survive along Lindell Boulevard at the north border of Forest Park.

The huge bird cage at the Saint Louis Zoological Park, dates to the fair. A Jain temple carved out of teak stood within the Indian Pavilion near the Ferris Wheel. It was dismantled after the exhibition and was reconstructed in Las Vegas at the Castaways hotel. It has recently been reassembled and is now on display at the Jain Center of Southern California at Los Angeles. Birmingham, Alabama's iconic cast iron Vulcan statue was first exhibited at the Fair in the Palace of Mines and Metallurgy. Additionally, a plaster reproduction of Alma Mater at Columbia University by Daniel Chester French was displayed at the Grand Sculpture Court of the exhibition.

The Missouri State building was the largest of the state buildings, as Missouri was the host state. Though it had sections with marble floors and heating and air conditioning, it was planned to be a temporary structure. However, it burned the night of November 18–19, just eleven days before the Fair was to end. Most of the interior was destroyed, but some contents were rescued without damage, including some furniture and much of the contents of the fair's Model Library. Since the fair was almost over, the building was not rebuilt. After the fair, the current World's Fair Pavilion in Forest Park was built on the site of the Missouri building with profits from the fair in 1909–10. 

Festival Hall, designed by Cass Gilbert and used for large-scale musical pageants, contained the largest organ in the world at the time, built by the Los Angeles Art Organ Company (which went bankrupt as a result). The great organ was debuted by the fair's official organist, Charles Henry Galloway. Though the opening concert was scheduled for the first day of the fair, complications related to its construction resulted in the opening concert being postponed until June 9. After the fair, the organ was placed into storage, and eventually purchased by John Wanamaker for his new Wanamaker's store in Philadelphia where it was tripled in size and became known as the Wanamaker Organ. The famous Bronze Eagle in the Wanamaker Store also came from the Fair. It features hundreds of hand-forged bronze feathers and was the centerpiece of one of the many German exhibits. Wanamaker's became a Lord & Taylor store and more recently, a Macy's store.

Completed in 1913, the Jefferson Memorial building was built near the main entrance to the Exposition, at Lindell and DeBalivere. It was built with proceeds from the fair, to commemorate Thomas Jefferson, who initiated the Louisiana Purchase, as was the first memorial to the third President. It became the headquarters of the Missouri History Museum, and stored the Exposition's records and archives when the Louisiana Purchase Exposition company completed its mission. The building is now home to the Missouri History Museum, and the museum was significantly expanded in 2002–3.

The State of Maine Building, which was a rustic cabin, was transported to Point Lookout, Missouri where it overlooked the White River by sportsmen who formed the Maine Hunting and Fishing Club. In 1915, when the main building at the College of the Ozarks in Forsyth, Missouri burned, the school relocated to Point Lookout, where the Maine building was renamed the Dobyns Building in honor of a school president. The Dobyns Building burned in 1930 and the college's signature church was built in its place. In 2004, a replica of the Maine building was built on the campus. The Keeter Center is named for another school president.

The observation tower erected by the American DeForest Wireless Telegraph Company was brought to the Fair when it became a hazard near Niagara Falls and needed to be removed because in the wintertime, ice from the fall's mist would form on the steel structure, and eventually fall onto the buildings below. It served as a communications platform for Lee DeForest's work in wireless telegraphy and a platform to view the fair. As Niagara Falls was near Buffalo New York, it was also called the Buffalo Tower After the World's Fair, it was moved to Creve Coeur Lake to be part of that park.

Westinghouse Electric sponsored the Westinghouse Auditorium, where they showed films of Westinghouse factories and products.

Introduction of new foods 
A number of foods are claimed to have been invented at the fair. The most popular claim is that the waffle-style ice cream cone was invented and first sold during the fair. However, it is widely believed that it was not invented at the Fair, but instead, it was popularized at the Fair. Other claims are more dubious, including the hamburger and hot dog (both traditional American foods), peanut butter, iced tea, and cotton candy. It is more likely, however, that these food items were first introduced to mass audiences and popularized by the fair. Dr Pepper and Puffed Wheat cereal were first introduced to a national audience at the fair. Daughter of slaves, Annie Fisher, brought her beaten biscuits, which were already famous in her hometown of Columbia, Missouri. The exposition awarded Fisher's biscuits a gold medal. They would later be enjoyed by President William Howard Taft on his 1911 visit to Missouri.

Though not the debut of as many foods as claimed, the fair offered what was essentially America's first food court. Visitors could sample a variety of fast foods, dine in dozens of restaurants, or just stroll through the mile-long pike where food was celebrated. As one historian said of the fair, one could breakfast in France, take a mid-morning snack in the Philippines, lunch in Italy, and dine in Japan.

Influence on popular music 
The fair inspired the song "Meet Me in St. Louis, Louis", which was recorded by many artists, including Billy Murray. Both the fair and the song are focal points of the 1944 feature film Meet Me in St. Louis starring Judy Garland, which also inspired a Broadway musical version. Scott Joplin wrote the rag "Cascades" in honor of the elaborate waterfalls in front of Festival Hall.

People on display 

Following the Spanish–American War, the peace treaty granted the United States control over Guam, the Philippines, and Puerto Rico. Puerto Rico had had a quasi-autonomous government as an "overseas province" of Spain, and the Philippines, having declared independence after the 1896-1899 Philippine Revolution, fought US annexation in the 1899-1902 Philippine–American War. These areas controversially became unincorporated territories of the United States in 1899, and people were brought from these territories to be on "display" at the 1904 fair.

1,102 Filipinos were displayed at the fair, 700 of them Philippine Scouts and Philippine Constabulary, used for controlling conflict among Filipinos and between Filipinos and fair organizers. Displays included the Apache of the American Southwest and the Igorot of the Philippines, both of which peoples were noted as "primitive". Within the Philippine reservation, was a school which was actively teaching Igorot students. The Philippine reservation at the exposition cost $1.1 million to create and operate. The people had been trafficked under harsh conditions and many did not survive. Burial plots in two St. Louis cemeteries were prepared in advance, however traditional burial practices were not allowed. Some of the people to be exhibited died en route or at the fair; bodies were immediately removed, and funeral rites had to be conducted without the bodies, in front of an oblivious public audience of fair attendees. Organizers choreographed ethnographic displays, having customs which marked special occasions restaged day after day.

Similarly, members of the Southeast Alaskan Tlingit tribe accompanied fourteen totem poles, two Native houses, and a canoe displayed at the Alaska Exhibit. Mary Benson, a noted Pomo basket weaver whose work is curated at the Smithsonian Institution and National Museum of the American Indian, attended to demonstrate her basket making skills which are described as astounding. Athletic events such as a basketball tournament were held to demonstrate the success of the Indian Boarding Schools and other assimilation programs. These efforts were confirmed with the Fort Shaw Indian School girls basketball team who were declared "World Champions" after beating every team who faced them in these denominational games. 

It has been argued that the "overriding purpose of the fair really centered on an effort to promote America's new role as an overseas imperial power", and that "While the juxtaposition of "modern" and "primitive" buttressed assumptions of racial superiority, representations of Native American and Filipino life created an impression of continuity between westward expansion across the continent and the new overseas empire." Racializing concepts and epithets used domestically were extended to the people of the overseas territories.

Ota Benga, a Congolese Pygmy, was featured at the fair. Later he was given the run of the grounds at the Bronx Zoo in New York, then featured in an exhibit on evolution alongside an orangutan in 1906, but public protest ended that.

In contrast, the Japan pavilion advanced the idea of a modern yet exotic culture unfamiliar to the turn-of-the-century Western world, much as it had during the earlier Chicago World's Fair. The Japanese government spent lavishly: $400,000, plus $50,000 from the Japanese colonial government of Formosa, with an additional $250,000 coming from Japanese commercial interests and regional governments. A 150,000 square foot garden, set on the hillside south of the Machinery Hall and Engine House, featured a replica of Kyoto's famous Kinkakuji, showing Japan's ancient sophistication, and a Formosa Mansion and Tea House, showing her modern colonial efforts. A second exhibition, "Fair Japan on the 'Pike'," organized by Kushibiki and Arai, welcomed the public through a large Niōmon-style gate into a realm of geisha-staffed exotic Japanese consumerism.

Exhibits 
After the fair was completed, many of the international exhibits were not returned to their country of origin, but were dispersed to museums in the United States. For example, the Philippine exhibits were acquired by the Museum of Natural History at the University of Iowa. The Vulcan statue is today a prominent feature of the Vulcan Park and Museum in Birmingham, Alabama, where it was originally cast.

The Smithsonian Institution coordinated the U.S. government exhibits. It featured a blue whale, the first full-cast of a blue whale ever created.

The Fair also featured the original "Floatopia". Visitors floated on rafts of all sorts in the tiny Forest Park Lake. Many Floatopias have occurred since, including the infamous San Diego Floatopia of '83 and the Santa Barbara Floatopia that has been happening for years.

One exhibit of note was Beautiful Jim Key, the "educated" Arabian-Hambletonian cross horse in his Silver Horseshoe Pavilion. He was owned by Dr. William Key, an African-American/Native American former slave, who became a respected self-taught veterinarian, and promoted by Albert R. Rogers, who had Jim and Dr. Key on tour for years around the US, helping to establish a humane movement that encouraged people to think of animals as having feelings and thoughts, and not just "brutes." Jim and Dr. Key became national celebrities along the way. Rogers invented highly successful marketing strategies still in use today. Jim Key could add, subtract, use a cash register, spell with blocks, tell time and give opinions on the politics of the day by shaking his head yes or no. Jim thoroughly enjoyed his "act"—he performed more than just tricks and appeared to clearly understand what was going on. Dr. Key's motto was that Jim "was taught by kindness" instead of the whip, which he was indeed.

Daisy E. Nirdlinger's book, Althea, or, the children of Rosemont plantation (illustrated by Egbert Cadmus (1868-1939)) was adopted by the Commissioners of the Louisiana Purchase Exposition as the official souvenir for young people.

1904 Summer Olympics 

The Fair hosted the 1904 Summer Olympic Games, the first Olympics held in the United States. The games had originally been awarded to Chicago, but when St. Louis threatened to hold a rival international competition, the games were relocated. Nonetheless, the sporting events, spread out over several months, were overshadowed by the Fair. With travel expenses high, many European athletes did not attend, nor did the founder of the modern Olympics, Baron Pierre de Coubertin.

Bullfight riot 

On June 5, 1904, a bullfight scheduled for an arena just north of the fairgrounds, in conjunction with the fair, turned violent when Missouri governor Alexander Monroe Dockery ordered police to halt the fight in light of Missouri's anti-bullfighting laws. Disgruntled spectators demanded refunds, and when they were turned away, they began throwing stones through the windows of the arena office. While police protected the office, they did not have sufficient numbers to protect the arena, which was burned to the ground by the mob. The exposition fire department responded to the fire, but disruption to the fair was minimal, as the riot took place on a Sunday, when the fair was closed.

Anglo-Boer War Concession 

Frank E. Fillis produced what was supposedly "the greatest and most realistic military spectacle known in the history of the world". Different portions of the concession featured a British Army encampment, several South African native villages (including Zulu, San, Swazi, and Ndebele) and a  arena in which soldiers paraded, sporting events and horse races were held and major battles from the Second Boer War were re-enacted twice a day. Battle recreations took 2–3 hours and included several Generals and 600 veteran soldiers from both sides of the war. At the conclusion of the show, the Boer General Christiaan de Wet would escape on horseback by leaping from a height of  into a pool of water.

Admission ranged from 25 cents for bleacher seats to one dollar for box seats, and admission to the villages was another 25 cents. The concession cost $48,000 to construct, grossed over $630,000, and netted about $113,000 to the fair—the highest-grossing military concession of the fair.

Notable attendees 

The Louisiana World's Fair was opened by President, Theodore Roosevelt, by telegraph, but he did not attend personally until after his reelection in November 1904, as he stated he did not wish to use the fair for political purposes. Attendees included John Philip Sousa, a musician, composer and conductor whose band performed on opening day and several times during the fair. Thomas Edison is claimed to have attended.

Ragtime music was popularly featured at the Fair. Scott Joplin wrote "The Cascades" specifically for the fair, inspired by the waterfalls at the Grand Basin, and presumably attended the fair.

Helen Keller, who was 24 and graduated from Radcliffe College, gave a lecture in the main auditorium.

J. T. Stinson, a well-regarded fruit specialist, introduced the phrase, "An apple a day keeps the doctor away" (at a lecture during the exhibition).

The French organist Alexandre Guilmant played a series of 40 recitals from memory on the great organ in Festival Hall, then the largest pipe organ in the world, including Toccata in D minor (Op. 108, No. 1) by Albert Renaud, which Renaud had dedicated to Guilmant.

Geronimo, the former war chief of the Apache, was "on display" in a teepee in the Ethnology Exhibit.

Grover Cleveland, the 22nd and 24th president, attended the opening ceremony on April 30 and "overshadowed President Roosevelt in popular applause, when both stood on the same platform.”

Henri Poincaré gave a keynote address on mathematical physics, including an outline for what would eventually become known as special relativity.

Jelly Roll Morton did not visit, stating in his later Library of Congress interview and recordings that he expected jazz pianist Tony Jackson would attend and win a jazz piano competition at the Exposition. Morton said he was "quite disgusted" to later learn that Jackson had not attended either, and that the competition had been won instead by Alfred Wilson; Morton considered himself a better pianist than Wilson.

The poet T. S. Eliot, who was born and raised in St. Louis, Missouri, visited the Igorot Village held in the Philippine Exposition section of the St. Louis World's Fair. Several months after the closing of the World's Fair, he published a short story entitled "The Man Who Was King" in the school magazine of Smith Academy, St. Louis, Missouri, where he was a student. Inspired by the ganza dance which the Igorot people presented regularly in the Village and their reaction to "civilization," the poet explored the interaction of a white man with the island culture. All this predates the poet's delving into the anthropological studies during his Harvard graduate years.

Max Weber visited upon first coming to the United States in hopes of using some of his findings for a case study on capitalism.

Jack Daniel, the American distiller and the founder of Jack Daniel's Tennessee whiskey distillery, entered his Tennessee whiskey into the World's Fair whiskey competition. After four hours of deliberation, the eight judges awarded Jack Daniel's Tennessee Whiskey the Gold Medal for the finest whiskey in the world. The award was a boon for the Jack Daniel's distillery.

Novelist Kate Chopin lived nearby and purchased a season ticket to the fair. After her visit on the hot day of August 20, she suffered a brain hemorrhage and died two days later, on August 22, 1904.

Philadelphia mercantilist, John Wanamaker, visited the exposition in November 1904 and purchased an entire collection of German furniture which included the giant jugendstil brass sculpture of an eagle that he would display in the rotunda of his Wanamaker's department store in Philadelphia. In 1909 Wanamaker also purchased the organ from the fair, which at the time was the biggest pipe organ in the world. It is still featured today, much enlarged, as the Wanamaker Organ in the Grand Court of his Philadelphia retail palace. Wanamaker purchased and donated an ancient Egyptian tomb, a mummy and other relics to the University Museum of the University of Pennsylvania.

Benedictine monk, artist and museum founder, Fr. Gregory Gerrer, OSB, exhibited his recent portrait of Pope Pius X at the fair. Following the fair, Gerrer brought the painting to Shawnee, Oklahoma, where it is now on display at the Mabee-Gerrer Museum of Art.

John McCormack, Irish tenor, was brought to the fair by James A. Reardon, who was in charge of the Irish exhibit.

The Sundance Kid visited the exposition, accompanied by Etta Place.

Postage stamps
In conjunction with the Exposition the U.S. Post Office issued a series of five commemorative stamps celebrating the 100th anniversary of the Louisiana Purchase. The 1-cent value portrays Robert Livingston, the ambassador who negotiated the purchase with France; the 2-cent value depicts Thomas Jefferson, who executed the purchase; the 3-cent honors James Monroe, who participated in negotiations with the French; the 5-cent memorializes William McKinley, who was involved with early plans for the Exposition; and the 10-cent presents a map of the Louisiana Purchase.

See also 

 Swedish Pavilion from the 1904 St. Louis World's Fair
 1904 Summer Olympics
 Central West End, St. Louis
 Forest Park
 Human zoo
 Meet Me in St. Louis
 Ota Benga, Congolese man put on display in the Bronx Zoo
 Owney (dog)
 Pyreliophorus
 Saint Louis Exposition (1884)
 St. Louis, Missouri
 University City, Missouri
 Washington University in St. Louis
 World's Largest Cedar Bucket
 List of world expositions
 List of world's fairs

References

Further reading 
 
 Afable, Patricia O. 'The Exhibition of Cordillerans in the United States during the Early 1900s'. The Igorot Quarterly, vol.6, no. 2, 1997,pg.19-22.
 Bennitt, Mark and Frank Parker Stockbridge, eds. History of the Louisiana Purchase Exposition, St. Louis, MO: Universal Exposition Publishing Company, 1905.
 Boeger, Astrid. 'St. Louis 1904.' In Encyclopedia of World's Fairs and Expositions, ed. John E. Findling and Kimberly D. Pelle. Jefferson, NC and London:McFarland, 2008.
 Brownell, Susan, The 1904 Anthropology Days and Olympic Games. Lincoln and London: University of Nebraska Press, 2008.
 
 Fox, Timothy J. and Duane R. Sneddeker, From the Palaces to the Pike: Visions of the 1904 World's Fair. St. Louis: Missouri Historical Society Press, 1997.
 Gilbert, James. Whose Fair?: Experience, Memory, and the History of the Great St. Louis Exposition (2009)
 Narita, Tatsushi, 'The Young T. S. Eliot and Alien Cultures: His Philippine Interactions.' The Review of English Studies, New Series, vol. 45, no. 180, 1994.
 Narita, Tatsushi. T. S. Eliot, The World Fair of St. Louis and 'Autonomy'''. Published for NCCF-Japan. Nagoya: Kougaku Shuppan, 2013.
 Narita, Tatsushi, T. S. Eliot and his Youth as 'A Literary Columbus', Nagoya: Kougaku Shuppan, 2011.
 Parezo, Nancy J. and Don D. Fowler, Anthropology Goes to the Fair: The 1904 Louisiana Purchase Exposition. Lincoln and London: University of Nebraska Press, 2007.
 Redman, Samuel. J. Bone Rooms: From Scientific Racism to Human Prehistory in Museums. Cambridge: Harvard University Press. 2016.
 Rydell, Robert W., All the World's a Fair. Chicago and London: University of Chicago Press, 1984.

Primary sources
 Francis, David Rowland. The universal exposition of 1904.'' (Louisiana purchase exposition Company, 1913). online, By the governor of Missouri.

External links 

 Official website of the BIE
 1904 World's Fair Society
 Louisiana Purchase Exposition Glass Plate Negatives Collection in Digital Collections at St. Louis Public Library
 Louisiana Purchase Exposition Miscellaneous Digital Collection of publications, tickets, programs, invitations, and fliers at St. Louis Public Library
 Online Exhibition by the Missouri Historical Society
 Louisiana Purchase Exposition collection at the University of Delaware Library
 An Edison company film of the Asia pavilion, at the Library of Congress
 History of the Louisiana Purchase Exposition
 Final Report of the Louisiana Purchase Exposition Commission at gutenberg
 5/7/1904;The Opening of the Louisiana Purchase Exposition
 The effect of the fair on Washington University
 Arthur Younger Ford (1861–1926) Photograph Albums (University of Louisville Photographic Archives) – includes 69 photos taken at the fair.
 The Louisiana Purchase Exposition: The 1904 St. Louis World's Fair from the University of Missouri Digital Library – scanned copies of nearly 50 books, pamphlets, and other related material from and about the Louisiana Purchase Exposition (The 1904 St. Louis World's Fair) including issues of the World's Fair Bulletin from June 1901 through the close of the Fair in December 1904.
 1904 St. Louis (BIE World Expo) - approximately 380 links
 The World's Fair: Comprising the Official Photographic Views of the Universal Exposition Held in Saint Louis, 1904
 Official Guide to the Louisiana Purchase Exposition
 Official Catalogue of Exhibits, Universal Exposition St. Louis 1904
 Kiralfy's Louisiana Purchase Spectacle
 The Opening: Universal Exposition, 1904
 On The Pike
 Inside an American Factory: Films of the Westinghouse Works, 1904
 Meet Me in St. Louis, Louis, sung by S.H. Dudley in 1904
 Celebrating the Louisiana Purchase online exhibit by St. Louis Public Library
 The Rhode Island Building: Louisiana Purchase Exposition St. Louis from the Rhode Island State Archives
 World's Fair St. Louis Official Ground Plan from the Rhode Island State Archives
 
 At The Fair: The Grandness of the 1904 St. Louis World's Fair
 Louisiana Purchase Exposition Collection finding aid at St. Louis Public Library
 Louisiana Purchase Exposition Sheet Music Collection finding aid at St. Louis Public Library
Louisiana Purchase Exposition Lantern Slides Finding Aid at the St. Louis Public Library
Louisiana Purchase Exposition Official Photographer Photos Finding Aid at the St. Louis Public Library
Louisiana Purchase Exposition Photo Albums Finding Aid at the St. Louis Public Library
Louisiana Purchase Exposition: Postcard Collection Finding Aid at the St. Louis Public Library
Louisiana Purchase Exposition: Stereograph Cards Collection Finding Aid at the St. Louis Public Library
Louisiana Purchase Exposition: Truman Ward Ingersoll Stereograph Cards Collection Finding Aid at the St. Louis Public Library

1904 in Missouri
Washington University in St. Louis
Exposition
Saint Louis Zoo
United States historical anniversaries
1900s in St. Louis
Festivals established in 1904